USCGC Friedman (WMSL-760) is the eleventh  of the United States Coast Guard. She is the first ship to be named after Elizebeth Smith Friedman, the famous American cryptologist.

Development and design 

All of Legend-class cutters were constructed by Huntington Ingalls Industries and were part of the Integrated Deepwater System Program. They are of the high endurance cutter roles with additional upgrades to make it more of an asset to the Department of Defense during declared national emergency contingencies. The cutters are armed mainly to take on lightly-armed hostiles in Low-Threat Environments.

Construction and career 
Friedman and her sister ship  were ordered on 21 December 2018. Construction by Huntington Ingalls Industries began on 11 May 2021.

References

Legend-class cutters
Ships of the United States Coast Guard